The 2013–14 Nevis Premier Division was the 10th, and most recent season of the Nevis Premier Division.

Table

Playoffs

Semifinal round

Consolation match 

SSG Strikers won 8–2 on aggregate.

Finals 

Horsford Highlights 3–3 Bath United. Horsford Highlights win 3–1 on penalties.

References 

N1 League seasons
1
Nevis